Hydatostega is a genus of flies in the family Dolichopodidae. It was formerly considered a synonym of Hydrophorus, but was recently restored as a separate genus.

Species
Hydatostega carmichaeli (Walker, 1849) − Tristan da Cunha
Hydatostega cerutias (Loew, 1872) – Canada, USA
Hydatostega christopherseni (Frey, 1954) − Tristan da Cunha
Hydatostega elevata (Becker, 1922) – Peru, Chile
Hydatostega kuscheli (Harmston, 1955) – Chile
Hydatostega nervosa (Becker, 1922) – Chile
Hydatostega ochrifacies (Van Duzee, 1930) – Chile
Hydatostega plumbea (Aldrich, 1911) − USA
Hydatostega poliogaster Philippi, 1865 – Chile, Uruguay
Hydatostega tristanensis (Macquart, 1847) − Tristan da Cunha
Hydatostega viridiflos (Walker, 1852) − Canada, USA, Mexico

References 

Dolichopodidae genera
Hydrophorinae
Diptera of North America
Diptera of South America
Fauna of Tristan da Cunha
Taxa named by Rodolfo Amando Philippi